Suan Lum Night Bazaar was a market in Bangkok's Pathum Wan district, at the intersection of Rama IV and Wireless/Sathorn Roads, opposite Lumphini Park at the MRT's Lumphini Station. Located on land owned by the Crown Property Bureau. It opened in 2001, and had closed by early 2011.

The Night Bazaar was open from 9 pm, with some shops open later. It had vendors selling gifts, clothing, jewellery, fruit, compact discs, handmade products like tapestries and fine arts, such as paintings and sculptures. There was a large beer garden, with an array of food available, and live entertainment. On the other side of the market there was a quieter area with many restaurants offering both inside and outside garden seating.

Bangkok Hall, a 6,000-capacity entertainment and special events hall, was located in the Night Bazaar. Until March 2007, it was called BEC-TERO Hall, and was primarily used by the media company to stage concerts. Also in the Night Bazaar was the Joe Louis Puppet Theatre, a traditional Thai puppet troupe that give performances of the Ramakien, Thailand's national epic.

Closing of Suan Lum
The property was leased from the Crown Property Bureau by P Con Development until March 31, 2006. Tenants were given until April 2007 to vacate the premises, but until late 2010 many vendors remained open.  As of early 2011, the night bazaar is now closed. As of 2021, that land was midway though the construction of One Bangkok, a giant development project consisting of offices, retail, residential and entertainment complexes.

Relocating to Suan Lum Night Bazaar Ratchadaphisek
The developer of Suan Lum nightbazaar has bought a large piece of land on Ratchadaphisek Rd. It plans to build a large mixed-use development, called Ratchada Night Bazaar. Most vendors will move to the new location. There is currently no market at Ratchadaphisek-Ladprao, the place is now a construction site. Expected completion is 2015.

See also
 Markets in Bangkok

References

External links
 Suan Lum & Siam Tribute news at 2Bangkok.com

Night markets in Bangkok
Pathum Wan district